Phaennidae is a family of planktonic copepods, found in pelagic or benthopelagic waters. It contains the following genera:
 Brachycalanus Farran, 1905
 Cephalophanes Sars, 1907
 Cornucalanus Wolfenden, 1905
 Kirnesius Markhaseva & Semenova, 2005
 Onchocalanus Sars, 1905
 Phaenna Claus, 1863
 Phaennocalanus Markhaseva, 2002
 Talacalanus Wolfenden, 1911
 Xanthocalanus Giesbrecht, 1892

References

Calanoida
Crustacean families